The Ursa Major Cluster (Ursa Major I Cluster, UMa I ClG) is a spiral-rich galaxy cluster of the Virgo Supercluster.

Some of its largest members are NGC 3631, NGC 3953, M109 on North (M109 Group) and NGC 3726, NGC 3938, NGC 4051 on South.

The Ursa Major cluster is located at a distance of 18.6 megaparsecs (60 million light-years) and contains about 30% of the light emitted but only 5% of the mass of the nearby Virgo Cluster.

External links 
 

 
Galaxy clusters
Virgo Supercluster
Ursa Major (constellation)